Southeastern College is a private institution of higher learning with campuses in Miami Lakes and West Palm Beach, Florida.

Southeastern College is institutionally accredited by the Accrediting Commission of Career Schools and Colleges (ACCSC) and licensed by the Commission for Independent Education (CIE), Florida Department of Education.

History 
Southeastern College was founded in 1988 as Cruise Career Training Institute with a specialization in training students and employees for careers in the travel industry. In 1997, the school expanded its career education offerings to include academic programs in business, computer science, and allied health. Following a series of name changes, the school became Southeastern College in 2012. In 2015, the West Palm Beach campus opened.

Academics 
Southeastern College awards diplomas, associate, and bachelor's degrees. The school offers 10 diploma programs, eight associate degrees, and one bachelor's degree. A majority of the school's academic programs are in the allied health programs. The school has recently expanded its offerings into business and technology. The school began enrolling for its first bachelor's degree, a Bachelor of Science in Nursing, in 2020.

Accreditation

Institutional accreditation 

Southeastern College is accredited by the Accrediting Commission of Career Schools and Colleges.

Programmatic accreditation 
 The Medical Assisting degree programs are accredited by the Accrediting Bureau of Health Education Schools (ABHES).
 The Associate of Science Degree in Surgical Technology programs and the pharmacy technology programs are accredited by the Commission on Accreditation of Allied Health Education Programs (CAAHEP).
 The Associate of Science in Nursing Degree program at the Miami Lakes Campus is accredited by the Accreditation Commission for Education in Nursing (ACEN).
 The pharmacy technology programs are accredited by the American Society of Health System Pharmacists (ASHSP).

Awards and recognition

In 2018, Southeastern College was named the School of the Year by the Florida Association of Post-Secondary Schools and Colleges (FAPSC). The same year, the president of the Miami Lakes campus, Julia Corona, was named the FAPSC Administrator of the Year. In 2020, Dana Hutton, campus president at Southeastern College's West Palm Beach campus, was named FAPSC Administrator of the Year. Southeastern College was named one of the South Florida Sun Sentinel's Top Workplaces for 2020.

Rankings 
 2021 Niche.com Best Colleges with Surgical Technologist Degrees in Florida
 2021 Best Colleges with Massage Therapy and Bodywork Degrees in South Carolina

See also 
 List of colleges and universities in Florida
 Lists of American universities and colleges

References 

Private universities and colleges in Florida
Universities and colleges in Miami-Dade County, Florida
Universities and colleges in Palm Beach County, Florida
Education in Miami-Dade County, Florida
Education in Palm Beach County, Florida
Education in Florida
Educational institutions established in 1988
Buildings and structures in West Palm Beach, Florida
Nursing degrees
Nursing schools in Florida
1988 establishments in Florida